The TAG Heuer Porsche Formula E Team is a German racing team that competes in Formula E, which is organized by the Fédération Internationale de l'Automobile (FIA). The team made its debut in the category at the 2019 Ad Diriyah ePrix, which started the 2019–20 season, and had their first race win at the 2022 Mexico City ePrix.

History

In July 2017, Porsche confirmed that they would leave the FIA World Endurance Championship at the end of the season in order to focus on their Formula E campaign, which was set to begin with the 2019–20 season. This meant that Porsche would be entering the series at the same time as the Mercedes-Benz EQ Formula E Team, though the latter already competed in the 2018–19 season through the affiliated HWA Racelab team.

2019–20 season

In December 2018, Neel Jani was announced as the first driver to drive for the new team. Brendon Hartley was also involved in the development of the new car. Porsche were then evaluating whether to sign the inexperienced Hartley or not. In July 2019, Porsche announced the former Techeetah driver André Lotterer as the second driver. In September, Porsche announced Simona de Silvestro and Thomas Preining as their new development drivers after Hartley got signed to the GEOX Dragon team. On 1 March 2020, Preining and Frédéric Makowiecki were brought to the Marrakesh rookie test, with Preining posting the fifteenth best lap and Makowiecki ending up the slowest of all drivers who partook the test.

2020-21 season 
In August 2020, it was confirmed that former Mahindra Racing driver Pascal Wehrlein would be joining the Porsche team for the 2020-21 season, replacing Neel Jani.

Sponsors

Results
(key) (results in bold indicate pole position; results in italics indicate fastest lap)

Notes
  – Driver was fastest in group qualifying stage and was given one championship point.
 † – Driver did not finish the race, but was classified as he completed over 90% of the race distance.

Footnotes

References

External links

German auto racing teams
Formula E teams
Porsche in motorsport